Tetsu Kuramitsu (born 9 July 1944) is a Japanese former professional tennis player.

Kuramitsu, who attended Rikkyo University, competed in the Orange Bowl as a junior player. He was a singles bronze medalist for Japan at the 1978 Asian Games in Bangkok. During his time on the professional tour he ranked as high as 281 in the world, making qualifying draw appearances at Wimbledon. He reached the second round of the 1979 Japan Open and made an ATP Challenger semi-final at Sapporo in 1986.

References

External links
 
 

1944 births
Living people
Japanese male tennis players
Asian Games medalists in tennis
Asian Games bronze medalists for Japan
Medalists at the 1978 Asian Games
Tennis players at the 1978 Asian Games
20th-century Japanese people